Daniel Morden (born 1964 in Cwmbran) is a Welsh storyteller in the oral tradition and a children's writer. Morden retells traditional stories from various cultures, in particular the Celtic and the ancient Greek. He has performed all over the world, in schools and theatres, at festivals and on the radio, for example. His published books include collections of stories and legends and retellings of Greek myths, the latter in joint work with Hugh Lupton.

Morden has twice won the English-language section of the Welsh Books Council's Tir na n-Og Awards, first in 2007 for Dark Tales from the Woods, based on Welsh folktales, and then in 2013 for Tree of Leaf and Flame, a collection of stories retelling the Mabinogion.

Books
 Weird Tales from the Storyteller (2003), illustrated by Jac Jones
 So Hungry (2004), ill. Suzanne Carpenter
 Dark Tales from the Woods (2005), ill. Brett Breckon
 The Other Eye (2006), ill. Jac Jones
 Tuck Your Vest In (2008), ill. Suzanne Carpenter
 Fearless (2009)
 Tree of Leaf and Flame (2012), ill. Brett Breckon
With Hugh Lupton
Hugh Lupton and Morden have written several volumes retelling ancient Greek stories.
 The Adventures of Odysseus (2006), illustrated by Christina Balit
 The Adventures of Achilles (2012), ill. Carole Hénaff
 Theseus and the Minotaur (2013), ill. Carole Hénaff
 Orpheus and Eurydice (2013), ill. Carole Hénaff
 Demeter and Persephone (2013), ill. Carole Hénaff

References

External links

  
 

1964 births
Welsh children's writers
British storytellers
People from Cwmbran
Living people